Language exposure for children is the act of making language readily available and accessible during the critical period for language acquisition. Deaf and hard of hearing children, when compared to their hearing peers, tend to face more hardships when it comes to ensuring that they will receive accessible language during their formative years. Therefore, deaf and hard of hearing children are more likely to have language deprivation which causes cognitive delays. Early exposure to language enables the brain to fully develop cognitive and linguistic skills as well as language fluency and comprehension later in life. Hearing parents of deaf and hard of hearing children face unique barriers when it comes to providing language exposure for their children. Yet, there is a lot of research, advice, and services available to those parents of deaf and hard of hearing children who may not know how to start in providing language.

Critical Period for Deaf and Hard of Hearing Children
The critical period for first language acquisition is a linguistic hypothesis that states that there is a window of time to acquire a language. After this period, it becomes much harder to further acquire a first or second language. Many theories exist on when exactly the critical period for language begins and ends; however, the research shows that when a child does not receive language exposure during their first few years of life, they have long term deficits in language acquisition.

Much of the research on language exposure, the critical period, and language acquisition are based on spoken languages and children who are hearing. In reality, these same ideas translate to deaf and hard of hearing children as well. For children who can hear and speak, first language exposure usually starts with their parents' native language. The same is true for deaf children with Deaf parents; they are exposed to sign language since birth. However, language exposure for deaf and hard of hearing children born to hearing parents is often delayed. Many deaf and hard of hearing children who are not exposed to language until later in life when they are given hearing devices (e.g., cochlear implant, hearing aids) show syntactic impairments (i.e., impairments in sentence structuring). Research concludes that it is not the hearing loss itself that affects language impairment, but rather if language input was received during their first year of life. Children who were exposed to language during their first year of life but lost their hearing after that year, still show normal syntactic development (i.e., language development).

Later language ability 
There has been additional research done about fluent sign language users and their ability to pick up spoken language later in life.  Sign language establishes an equally solid foundation in general language abilities as does a spoken language, whether it be reading, learning a second language, or basic linguistic skills, as long as it is learned in the critical period of language acquisition.

Additionally, research shows that children who learn a sign language alongside a spoken language during their critical period of language acquisition develop comparably to bilingual children learning two spoken languages.

Benefits of Language Exposure 
Sign languages such as American Sign Language, have been recognized as an official language after research that started in the 1960s. The research proved that signed languages are real languages with complex structure, syntax, and grammar just like that of spoken languages. Furthermore, they both make use of the same regions in the left hemisphere of the brain for planning and processing language.

Both deaf children and hearing children with proper language exposure and education have normal cognitive developments. In fact, deaf children and hearing children have similar language milestones and timelines. According to the language development and milestone sources, babies that can hear who are exposed to language will typically start to babble (e.g., ma-ma, da-da) between the ages of 6 to 12 months. Similarly, deaf babies that are exposed to a signed language will start to "babble" with their hands by using organized and repetitive elements of their signed language.

Deaf, hard of hearing, and hearing children have equal potential to develop typical cognitive abilities; deafness does not directly cause any cognitive impairments nor language delays. However, deaf and hard of hearing children are at much higher risk for having inadequate exposure to language during their critical periods which can in turn cause cognitive and language delays.

Providing Language Exposure 
There are two primary approaches proposed for exposing deaf and hard of hearing children to language. The first is through sign language and the second is through spoken language. However, it is not necessary to choose one or the other. Research shows that learning two languages, regardless of what languages they are, can provide unique cognitive advantages to bilingual individuals. Furthermore, bilingualism opens up more opportunities for the individual by enabling them to interact with users of multiple languages. For deaf and hard of hearing children in particular, learning both a signed language from birth and spoken/written language as they are able to access those modalities can protect the child from the harms that come from the language deprivation that occurs when a child is delayed in accessing language in any modality.

From Birth 

About 90-95% of deaf and hard of hearing children are born to hearing parents. Only 5-10% are born to deaf parents.  Currently, there are newborn hearing screening practices in place that inform parents of their newborn's hearing status within the first few weeks of the child's life. If a baby is diagnosed with hearing loss, hospitals usually provide access to a team that includes primary care physicians, audiologists, and other health care providers to help the family decide which path is most appropriate for their family or their child to ensure that the baby develops normally with language. However, some physicians report that they aren't confident about informing the parents of deaf and hard of hearing children about other steps to take in addition to visiting an audiologist.

Sign Language 
When deaf children are born to Deaf parents who use sign language, their language exposure is constant and fully accessible from birth. This is equivalent to the quality of language exposure received by hearing children. These children thus demonstrate typical language acquisition. However, most deaf and hard of hearing children have hearing parents with no experience in sign language. There are many options available to these parents to help them provide their child with as much fully accessible language as possible from birth onward.

First, many schools for the deaf offer sign language classes to parents who want to learn to sign with their kid. Some schools even offer Parent Infant programs which allow parents to bring their infants to the class and provide both language instruction to the parents, sign language exposure to the infant, and structured play time for the parents and infants to all interact in sign language with signing instructors present to facilitate and answer questions.

For toddlers and preschoolers, there are signing preschool classes offered at most schools for the deaf. These are places where deaf and hard of hearing children can come and spend the school day in fun, language rich classrooms which may provide more fluent sign language exposure than many hearing parents are able to provide at this point in their journey. Additionally, these preschools provide deaf and hard of hearing children with the much needed chance to start building peer relationships with others who share their language.

Some states in the U.S., such as Tennessee, have also established Deaf Mentorship programs to guide families with new deaf and hard of hearing children through the first year of life with their baby. By connecting hearing parents with a Deaf role model, these programs allow parents to glimpse the wonderful adults their child can become, help parents to get plugged into the Deaf community, and empower parents locate and access the other available resources around them (such as the other resources mentioned in this section).

Cochlear implants and exposure 

Many doctors recommend families with babies diagnosed with hearing loss see an audiologist. To some, an audiologist referral is an attempt to solve a problem of hearing loss. To others, it is seen as an act of denying the baby a chance to explore and become a part of the Deaf community. Since their introduction, there has been heated debate over research on cochlear implants. This surgery is a common recommendation for children born deaf, in order to attempt to get the child to hear, understand, and use spoken language rather than or sometimes in addition to sign language. The debate mostly centers around the view that deafness is a problem that needs to be fixed. Many proud members of the Deaf community view the implantation as trying to fix someone who is already whole, and may find this insulting and even unethical. Others view it as a very real possibility to open doors and give children the opportunity to function with more accessibility in a hearing society.

In 2018, a systematic review of all the literature on cochlear implants and language acquisition outcomes was published which concluded that it is unlikely for most deaf children to catch up to their hearing peers in spoken language acquisition through the use of cochlear implants. However, language outcomes were better the earlier the child was given access to language (in this case spoken language through implants). One solution that has been proposed to this is to provide exposure to sign language for all deaf children starting as close to birth as possible for the parents regardless of whether they plan to pursue cochlear implants or hearing aids later on. This strategy ensures maximum possible language exposure for the children and mitigates the risk of language deprivation often entailed in waiting to see if cochlear implants will be successful for any given child.

Grade school 

Unlimited language exposure includes having education options available in one's own language. Access to communication and language is vital for deaf students' success. To ensure deaf children are properly set up for future success in classrooms, early language exposure is essential. In a classroom, access to social and academic communication is equally as important for language and cognitive development.

In the United States of America, the Americans with Disabilities Act (ADA) and the Individuals with Disabilities Education Act (IDEA) states that a public education should be provided to each child with a disability in the "least restrictive environment" for them. As a broad statement, this is up to interpretation. Often this means that children with hearing loss get access to public schools with an interpreter.

The effectiveness of accommodating with sign language interpreters is dependent on the language status of the deaf and hard of hearing students. Deaf and hard of hearing students that are language deprived will not benefit as much from interpreters in the classroom as deaf and hard of hearing students who have little to no language deprivation would. Students whose only language partner is their interpreter will see far less linguistic benefit than those who have a plethora and variety of language partners in the classroom.Therefore, providing one sign language interpreter may not be enough of an accommodation to create an equitable educational classroom environment for deaf and hard of hearing students in mainstream classrooms.

While schools in the United States that teach primarily in sing language are rare compared to mainstream public schools, each state typically has at least one Deaf school where Deaf children can attend and receive their education in sign language. A few examples are The Learning Center for the Deaf, the Maryland School for the Deaf, the Texas School for the Deaf, etc. Other deaf schools may teach in an oralist method, prohibiting signing and focusing only on speech, a total communication method, with a pidgin sign language accompanying a speaking teacher, also known as simultaneous communication, and a bilingual approach that includes both sign and speech, but in a separated way.

LEAD-K 
LEAD-K stands for Language Equality and Acquisition for Deaf Kids. LEAD-K is an American campaign promoting language acquisition and kindergarten readiness for Deaf and Hard of Hearing children ages 0–5. LEAD-K recognizes Deaf children may struggle socially and academically when entering school due to inadequate language exposure in their early stages of life. LEAD-K has proposed a bill that will require assessments for certain language milestones for Deaf and hard of hearing children to ensure they are being adequately prepared for future academic success. The bill allows for assessments to be conducted in ASL and/or written/spoken English.

LEAD-K hopes the data that would be collected from assessments proposed by their bills would be used to hold state education systems accountable if their deaf and hard of hearing students seem to be falling behind on the milestones they should be meeting. LEAD-K wants everyone to recognize the importance of early language exposure and steady language progress for all children. Reaching the right language milestones on a consistent timeline will help deaf and hard of hearing children maintain a healthy developmental path.

Notes

Applied linguistics
Deaf education
Language acquisition